Vilovataya may refer to one of the following two rivers in Murmansk Oblast, Russia:
Vilovataya (White Sea), a direct tributary of the White Sea
Vilovataya (Vyala), a tributary of the Vyala